This page lists the rosters of the 2021 BAL season, the inaugural season of the Basketball Africa League (BAL). Each team features 13 players. On the rosters, a maximum of four foreign players is allowed including maximum two non-African players.

On 14 May 2021, the official rosters were revealed by the BAL. The teams feature 154 players from 24 countries. Ben Uzoh of the Rivers Hoopers is the only player with previous NBA experience, while nine players have played in the NBA G League. A total of 21 players have played collegiate basketball in the NCAA Division I.

AS Douanes

AS Salé

AS Police

FAP

Ferroviário de Maputo

GNBC

GS Pétroliers

Patriots

Petro de Luanda

Rivers Hoopers

US Monastir

Zamalek

References

rosters